Norwegian International Ship Register or NIS is a separate Norwegian ship register for Norwegian vessels aimed at competing with flags of convenience registers such as Panama and Liberia. Originally proposed by Erling Dekke Næss in 1984, it was established in Bergen in 1987 and is managed by the Norwegian Ship Registers. In 2010, it was the 12th ship register by gross tonnage, representing 1% of the global tonnage.

Objectives
In the years before the register was established, the Norwegian register lost out as it could not compete with lower-cost registers. The main objectives of establishing the register were:

Maintain the shipping industry under the Norwegian flag.
Provide better competitive conditions for the Norwegian merchant fleet in worldwide trade.
Initiate registration requirements in accordance with Norway's obligations under international agreements, (especially United Nations (UN), International Maritime Organization (IMO) and International Labour Organization (ILO)).
Maintain a Norwegian fleet that could give greater employment opportunities to Norwegian seaman than a foreign-flagged fleet.
Restrict the types of vessel that may be registered.
Limit the trading areas allowed. NIS vessels cannot trade cargo between Norwegian ports or carry passengers on a regular basis to or from Norwegian ports.

Criticism 
There has been some criticism of countries that have opened second registers, such as Norway (NIS), Germany (GIS) and Denmark (DIS), because there are fewer restrictions on the nationality of the crew and allegedly lower safety standards than the main national register.

See also 

 Flag of convenience
 Flag state

References

External links
 Official website for both NIS and NOR registers

Water transport in Norway
Ship registration
1987 establishments in Norway
Government agencies established in 1987
1987 in transport
Organisations based in Bergen
Transport in Bergen